Thomas Larsen (born 11 February 1954) is a Danish former footballer who played as a midfielder. He made two appearances for the Denmark national team in 1980.

References

External links
 
 

1954 births
Living people
Danish men's footballers
Association football midfielders
Denmark international footballers
Lyngby Boldklub players
Boldklubben 1903 players